Several suicide bombers penetrated the security of Kandahar Airfield on Tuesday, 8 December 2015, barricading themselves in an old school building that now contains shops, and sparking a battle with Afghan soldiers that lasted for many hours. The Afghan Defense Ministry stated that 50 civilians and members of the security forces had been killed, along with 11 attackers, while at least 35 people were injured. The Taliban claimed responsibility. The attack was co-ordinated just hours after a "Message to Obama" was posted on a video site by the Taliban, warning U.S. troops of upcoming attack.

See also
 2008 Kandahar bombing
 2009 Kandahar bombing
 Mufti Mohammad Sayeed
 Indian Airlines Flight 814

References

2015 murders in Afghanistan
Mass murder in 2015
Suicide bombings in Afghanistan
Terrorist incidents in Afghanistan in 2015
Terrorist attacks on airports
December 2015 crimes in Asia
December 2015 events in Afghanistan
History of Kandahar
Attacks on buildings and structures in Afghanistan
Building bombings in Afghanistan
Attacks in Afghanistan in 2015